German submarine U-146 was a Type IID U-boat of Nazi Germany's Kriegsmarineduring World War II. Her keel was laid down on 30 March 1940 by Deutsche Werke in Kiel as yard number 275. She was launched on 21 September 1940 and commissioned on 30 October with Eberhart Hoffmann in command.

U-146 began her service life with the 1st U-boat Flotilla. She was then assigned to the 22nd flotilla and subsequently to the 3rd flotilla where she conducted two patrols, sinking one ship, in 1941. She spent the rest of the war as a training vessel, moving back to the 22nd flotilla.

She was scuttled on 5 May 1945.

Design
German Type IID submarines were enlarged versions of the original Type IIs. U-146 had a displacement of  when at the surface and  while submerged. She had two shafts and two  propellers.

U-146 was fitted with three  torpedo tubes at the bow, five torpedoes or up to twelve Type A torpedo mines, and a  anti-aircraft gun. The boat had a complement of 25.

Operational career

First patrol
The submarine's first patrol commenced with her departure from Kiel on 17 June 1941. She crossed the North Sea and negotiated the gap between the Faroe and Shetland Islands. She then sailed to a point south-west of Ireland.

Second patrol
For her second patrol, she left Kiel on 26 July 1941. Her return was on 11 August. No further details are available.

Fate
The boat was scuttled in the Raederschleuse (lock) at Wilhelmshaven on 5 May 1945. The wreck was broken up on an unknown date.

Summary of raiding history

References

Bibliography

External links

German Type II submarines
U-boats commissioned in 1940
World War II submarines of Germany
1940 ships
Ships built in Kiel
Operation Regenbogen (U-boat)
Maritime incidents in May 1945